The 2009 Big 12 Conference softball tournament was held at ASA Hall of Fame Stadium in Oklahoma City, OK from May 8 through May 10, 2009. Missouri won their second conference tournament and earned the Big 12 Conference's automatic bid to the 2009 NCAA Division I softball tournament. 

Missouri would go on to play in the 2009 Women's College World Series.

Standings
Source:

Schedule
Source:

All-Tournament Team
Source:

References

Big 12 Conference softball tournament
Tournament
Big 12 softball tournament